Armenian numerals form a historic numeral system created using the majuscules (uppercase letters) of the Armenian alphabet.

There was no notation for zero in the old system, and the numeric values for individual letters were added together. The principles behind this system are the same as for the Ancient Greek numerals and Hebrew numerals. In modern Armenia, the familiar Arabic numerals are used. Armenian numerals are used more or less like Roman numerals in modern English, e.g. Գարեգին Բ. means Garegin II and Գ. գլուխ means Chapter III (as a headline).

The final two letters of the Armenian alphabet, "o" (Օ) and "fe" (Ֆ), were added to the Armenian alphabet only after Arabic numerals were already in use, to facilitate transliteration of other languages. Thus, they sometimes have a numerical value assigned to them.

Table

Algorithm
Numbers in the Armenian numeral system are obtained by simple addition.  Armenian numerals are written left-to-right (as in the Armenian language).  Although the order of the numerals is irrelevant since only addition is performed, the convention is to write them in decreasing order of value.

Samples
  = 1975 = 1000 + 900 + 70 + 5
  =  2222 = 2000 + 200 + 20 + 2
  = 2004 = 2000 + 4
  = 120 = 100 + 20
  = 50

To write numbers greater than 9999, it is necessary to have numerals with values greater than 9000. This is done by drawing a line over them, indicating their value is to be multiplied by 10000. This is similar to Roman numerals, where a line over a character means multiplying the corresponding value by 1000.

Examples:
 Ա = 10000
 Ջ = 9000000
 ՌՃԽԳ = 11431255

References 

Numerals